Sir William Taillour sometimes spelt Taylor or Taylour (1406–1483) was Lord Mayor of London in 1468 (during the reign of Henry VI).

He was a wealthy grocer who served as a Sheriff of London for 1455 and was made an Alderman in 1458. He was knighted on 21 May 1471, (the same day that Henry VI of England died) and elected Member of Parliament for the City of London in 1483 as one of the two aldermanic representatives for the city.

He died in 1483.

Taylour House, Edenbridge
Taylour House in Edenbridge was built for Sir William Taylour, and his coat of arms are in the right spandrel of the entrance door and that of the Grocers company in the left. Formally known as "The Griffin" it has a Jacobean staircase and a number of Jacobean wall paintings.

See also
List of Sheriffs of London
List of Lord Mayors of London
City of London (elections to the Parliament of England)

References

External links
The Aldermen of the City of London, vol. II
http://www.girders.net/Ta/Taylor,%20Sir%20William,%20(d.1483).doc 

1406 births
1483 deaths
Sheriffs of the City of London
English MPs 1483
Members of the Parliament of England for the City of London
15th-century lord mayors of London